The Chinese Canadian National Council (CCNC), known in the Chinese-Canadian community as Equal Rights Council (平權會), is an organization whose purpose is to promote equity, social justice, inclusive civic participation, and respect for diversity. The first CCNC in Ontario was CCNCTO, founded in 1980. 

In 2019, CCNC-SJ was founded to monitor racial discrimination in Canada and to help young Chinese Canadians learn about their cultural history.

History 
The organization was created in 1980, after an incident in September 1979 when the CTV Television Network incorrectly represented Chinese Canadians in an investigative show called W5. In a feature called "Campus Giveaways", CTV used allegedly incorrect statistics to conclude that foreign students were eroding other Canadians' opportunities for a secondary education and benefitting from public universities funded by Canadian taxpayers. All Chinese university students were treated as foreign students, regardless of their real nationality. The show also made numerous racial remarks about the Chinese students. The incident and the resulting campaign were reported in the Canadian media.

In response, Chinese communities across Canada staged protests against CTV and forced the President of CTV to publicly apologize for the W5 feature. After the incident, Chinese who protested against CTV across Canada staged a meeting in Toronto. The meeting called for a stronger voice representing Chinese Canadians nationwide, thus the CCNC was formed. By 1980, the organization had developed nationwide presence with twenty-eight chapters.  The United Chinese Community Enrichment Services Society (S.U.C.C.E.S.S.) was accepted as a voting member in 1989.

Advocacy history 
Since the formation of the CCNC, it has spoken out against racial discrimination against Chinese in Canada. The CCNC is also involved in controversial issues concerning Chinese in Canada, like forcing the Government of Canada to apologize and redress the head tax that Chinese had to paid from 1885 to 1923.

On November 28, 2005, the Toronto chapter of the CCNC (CCNCTO) was granted the William P. Hubbard Award for Race Relations by the Toronto city government, in recognition of the CCNC's advocacy for Head Tax redress.

CCNC-SJ has criticized the Bank of Canada for leaving out the image of an Asian Canadian from its 100 dollar bill and condemned the bank for listening to 'racist comments and feedback from the focus group' of its bank note design. The Bank of Canada later apologized to the CCNC-SJ's executive director Victor Wong.

References 

Chinese Canadian organizations